Yad Ezra V'Shulamit is a Jewish charity organization located in Israel. Founded in 1998, its mission is to feed poor and hungry families in Israel, with a special focus on providing daily hot meals for children. It distributes thousands of food baskets each week to poor Israeli families, provides daily hot lunches for children, runs annual clothing and school supply drives, and operates a job desk for unemployed adults. The motto of the organization is "Breaking the Cycle of Poverty, One Child at a Time".

History
Yad Ezra V'Shulamit was founded in 1998 by Aryeh Lurie, a native Israeli who grew up in poverty. The organization is named after Lurie's parents.

Projects

Food baskets
Yad Ezra V'Shulamit distributes 3,000 food baskets to families in Israel each week. Food baskets contain basic necessities, such as bread, canned goods, and chicken for Shabbat. Nearly 15,000 food baskets are distributed to many more families for the Rosh Hashanah and Passover holidays. The organization relies on volunteers to assemble the food baskets at its central warehouse.

Children's Centers
Hundreds of children in different parts of the country attend Yad Ezra V'Shulamit's Children's Centers, where they receive a hot meal daily. Many children that come to the center are from families in which one or both parents are sick and unable to work, or they are orphans. In addition to the meal, they receive tutoring and attention from trained professionals, counselors, tutors, and volunteers.

Clothing distribution
Yad Ezra V’Shulamit organizes winter campaigns to provide coats and blankets for children whose parents can't afford them. They also buy other winter gear such as boots, scarves, and gloves, and distribute them to needy children. Yad Ezra V'Shulamit also runs school-supply campaigns to provide children with basic necessities such as backpacks, pencils and notebooks.

Job desk
Many of the parents who receive food baskets are from a lower-class background, and have not received even a high school education. Thus, the jobs that are available to them are very limited. Yad Ezra V'Shulamit helps these people with their resumes and prepares them for job interviews.

References

External links
Yadezra - website

Jewish charities based in Israel
Volunteer organizations in Israel
Organizations established in 1998
Hunger relief organizations